Pultenaea divaricata is a species of flowering plant in the family Fabaceae and is endemic to a small area of New South Wales. It is an erect shrub with linear, needle-shaped, grooved leaves, and dense clusters of yellow to orange flowers with red markings.

Description

Taxonomy and naming
Pultenaea divaricata was first formally described in 1921 by Herbert Bennett Williamson in the Proceedings of the Royal Society of Victoria. The specific epithet (divaricata) means "spreading widely".

Distribution and habitat
This pultenaea grows in swampy heath on the coast and tablelands of New South Wales from the Blue Mountains to Corang.

References

divaricata
Flora of New South Wales
Plants described in 1921